Estlin may refer to:

Places
Estlin, Saskatchewan, hamlet in Saskatchewan, Canada

People

 John Prior Estlin (1747–1817), English Unitarian minister
 John Bishop Estlin (1785–1855), English ophthalmic surgeon
 Mary Estlin (1820–1902), British abolitionist
 Peter Estlin (born 1961), alderman of the City of London Corporation